Steve orStephen Crowe may refer to:

 Steve Crowe (rugby league) (born 1969), rugby league footballer 
 Stephen Crowe (composer), English composer

See also 
 Stephen Crow (born 1965), game programmer